Bipalium fuscatum is a species of land planarian first described by William Stimpson in 1857. This hammerhead flatworm may be able to survive for days in a human lung as a pseudoparasite.

References

Geoplanidae
Animals described in 1857